Faisal Arab is a Pakistani jurist who serves as Justice of the Supreme Court of Pakistan since 13 December 2015.

He was formerly the Chief Justice of Sindh High Court from 17 February 2015 until his appointment to the Supreme Court. who also served as head of a special three-member court to hear the high treason case against former military ruler General Pervez Musharraf in November 2013.

He was among those judges who refused to take the oath as a PCO judge in 2007. Justice Arab has been described, by legal observers, as liberal in his jurisprudence and has taken moderate stance on the judicial interpretation when deciding judgements on many cases of importance.

Early life and education 
Born on Nov 5, 1955, Justice Arab graduated in commerce in 1978 from the Government College of Commerce & Economics, Karachi,  and completed his LLB in 1989 from Sindh Muslim Law College. He was enrolled as an advocate of the high court in 1992 and in the Supreme Court in 2005.

Professional & Judicial Career 
As a lawyer, he first interned at Fakhruddin G. Ebrahim & Company in 1990. Then he worked in his law firm in the name of Faisal Arab & Associates from 2000 to 2005. Mr.Arab was appointed additional judge of the Sindh High Court in October 2005 and a permanent judge of the Sindh High Court on Oct 25, 2006. However he, along with other judges, was deposed when General Parvez Musharraf declared a state of emergency in the country and promulgated his infamous Nov 3, 2007 Provisional Constitutional Order.Justice Arab was among those judges who refused to take the oath as a PCO judge in 2007.Among legal circles, Justice Arab is known for his quick disposal of cases.

Justice Arab was appointed head of a special three-member court to hear the high treason case against former military ruler Gen Pervez Musharraf in November 2013.He conducted the proceedings in a very fair manner and without any bias," says Barrister Farogh Naseem(counsel for the accused), referring to the fact that his client had imposed a state of emergency that led to the removal of several judges, including Justice Arab. He was appointed as Chief Justice of Sindh Highcourt On 17 February 2015.

See also 
Sindh High Court

References

External links 
www.sindhhighcourt.gov.pk

1955 births
Living people
Justices of the Supreme Court of Pakistan
Pakistani judges
Sindh Muslim Law College alumni
Chief Justices of the Sindh High Court
People from Sindh